Neil Trimm (born February 15, 1983) is a Canadian former professional ice hockey player.

Career
Trimm turned professional in 2008 after signing a contract with the New Mexico Scorpions of the Central Hockey League. He then signed with the Laredo Bucks of the CHL and stayed for two seasons. During his second season with the Bucks during the 2010-11 CHL season, Trimm scored 80 points including 58 assists and played in the CHL All-Star game. Despite his prolific scoring, the Bucks failed to make the playoffs.

Trimm moved to the ECHL for the 2011-12 season and signed for the Cincinnati Cyclones, but he only played two games for the team before re-joining the Bucks. The Bucks would suspend operations on May 1, 2012 and Trimm moved on to the Wichita Thunder where he scored 76 points which included 35 goals.

In 2013, Trimm moved to Europe and signed for the Frederikshavn White Hawks of the Metal Ligaen in Denmark. He would however make just six appearances before leaving four months later to sign for the Braehead Clan in the Elite Ice Hockey League in the United Kingdom and managed 58 points including 42 assists in 45 games. He re-signed for a second season with the Scottish team for the 2014-15 EIHL season, scoring 26 goals and 41 assists for 67 points in 52 games. In 2015, Trimm moved to the Coventry Blaze of the EIHL, but he only managed to net seven goals in 36 games before he departed and made a return to Glasgow to finish the season, and eventually his career, with the Clan. Trimm would not sign another contact and retired from hockey.

Awards and honours

References

External links

1983 births
Canadian ice hockey forwards
Laredo Bucks players
Living people
New Mexico Scorpions (CHL) players
Wichita Thunder players
Coventry Blaze players
Braehead Clan players
Canadian expatriate ice hockey players in England
Canadian expatriate ice hockey players in Scotland
Canadian expatriate ice hockey players in the United States
Canadian expatriate ice hockey players in Denmark
Ice hockey people from Ontario
People from Renfrew County